Anchal Sabharwal is a film actress and model, who has appeared in Hindi television series and regional feature films.

Career
Anchal first appeared in many TV commercials and then in few Hindi television series. Her first film was in Telugu, Masth. Her first Hindi film was Rupali Guha's Aamras. She made her debut in Kannda in 2011 and played a supporting role in Kempe Gowda. She was first supposed to play the lead role in the film. She replaced Mugdha Chaphekar as Aarti Jhaveri in the sitcom Sajan Re Jhoot Mat Bolo.

Filmography

References

External links
 
 

Actresses from Delhi
Living people
Indian television actresses
Year of birth missing (living people)
Indian film actresses
Actresses in Hindi television
Actresses in Telugu cinema
Actresses in Hindi cinema
Actresses in Malayalam cinema
21st-century Indian actresses